Roslyatino is a rural locality (a village) in Kubenskoye Rural Settlement, Vologodsky District, Vologda Oblast, Russia. The population was 13 as of 2002.

Geography 
Roslyatino is located 57 km northwest of Vologda (the district's administrative centre) by road. Cherepanikha is the nearest rural locality.

References 

Rural localities in Vologodsky District